The third round of CONCACAF matches for 2022 FIFA World Cup qualification, nicknamed the Octagonal (for the eight teams participating), was played from September 2021 to March 2022. Canada (qualifying for the first time since 1986), Mexico, and the United States qualified for the 2022 FIFA World Cup, while Costa Rica advanced to the inter-confederation play-offs. Panama, Jamaica, El Salvador, and Honduras were eliminated in this round.

The match was seen by 2.1 million viewers in the United States on the day of its original broadcast, becoming Telemundo's most-watched sporting event since the 2019 Copa América Final.

Format
Eight teams (CONCACAF teams ranked 1 to 5 based on the FIFA rankings of July 2020, and the three winners of the second round) played against each other home-and-away in a round-robin format for a total of 14 matches per team. The top three teams qualified for the 2022 FIFA World Cup, while the fourth-placed team advanced to the inter-confederation play-offs in Qatar.

Schedule
The third round was originally scheduled to begin in June 2021, but was postponed by the COVID-19 pandemic. The full schedule for the third round was announced on 16 June 2021, and confirmed on 9 August 2021.

Qualified teams
The top five teams based on the FIFA rankings of July 2020 (shown in parentheses) received a bye to the third round. For consistency, the three winners of the second round are shown with their FIFA rankings as of July 2020.

Draw
The draw for the third round was held, along with the draw for the first round, on 19 August 2020, 19:00 CEST (UTC+2), at the FIFA headquarters in Zürich, Switzerland.

Teams were drawn from a single pot, and then were allocated a position (from 1 to 8) to determine the match schedule. The identity of the three second round winners was not known at the time of the draw.

Note: Bolded teams qualified for the World Cup. Costa Rica advanced to the inter-confederation play-offs.

Standings

Matches

Matchday 1

Matchday 2

Matchday 3

Matchday 4

Matchday 5

Matchday 6

Matchday 7

Matchday 8

Matchday 9

Matchday 10

Matchday 11

Matchday 12

Matchday 13

Matchday 14

Statistics

Goalscorers

Awards
Best XI
CONCACAF announced the following squad as the best eleven of the third round of qualifying after the conclusion of the campaign.

Notes

References

External links

Qualifiers – North, Central America and Caribbean: Matches, FIFA.com
World Cup Qualifying – Men, CONCACAF.com

3
Qual3
FIFA World Cup qualification - CONCACAF Third Round
FIFA World Cup qualification - CONCACAF Third Round
FIFA World Cup qualification - CONCACAF Third Round
FIFA World Cup qualification - CONCACAF Third Round
FIFA World Cup qualification - CONCACAF Third Round
FIFA World Cup qualification - CONCACAF Third Round
Canada at the 2022 FIFA World Cup
Costa Rica at the 2022 FIFA World Cup
Mexico at the 2022 FIFA World Cup
United States at the 2022 FIFA World Cup